A by-election was held for the New South Wales Legislative Assembly electorate of Yass Plains on 10 January 1882 because of the death of Michael Fitzpatrick.

Dates

Candidates

 Dr Allan Campbell was a local surgeon. This was his only candidacy for the Legislative Assembly.

 Louis Heydon was a solicitor from Sydney who had been defeated at the Argyle by-election in December 1881.

Result

Michael Fitzpatrick died.

See also
Electoral results for the district of Yass Plains
List of New South Wales state by-elections

References

1882 elections in Australia
New South Wales state by-elections
1880s in New South Wales